The Brodribb River is a perennial river of the Snowy River catchment, located in the East Gippsland region of the Australian state of Victoria.

Course and features
The river flows generally south by west by south, joined by the Big, Rich, and Jack rivers and sixteen minor tributaries, flowing through a series of reserves and through Lake Curlip, before reaching its confluence with the Snowy River, within the Lake Corringle-Lake Wat Wat Wildlife Reserve in the Shire of East Gippsland. The river descends  over its  course.

In its upper reaches, the river is traversed on multiple occasions by the Bonang Highway.

The catchment area of the river is administered by the East Gippsland Catchment Management Authority.

Aboriginal massacre

At some time in 1850, 15 to 20 Gunai people were killed on the banks of the Brodribb River, a few miles south east of Orbost.  The killing was reported to have been revenge for the murder of station cook Dan Dempsey, for lacing a gift of flour to local Gunai people with arsenic.  The Aboriginal police were believed to have been involved in the massacre.

Etymology
The river was named in honour of William Adams Brodribb, an early settler.

See also

 List of rivers of Australia
 Gippsland massacres

References

External links
 
 
 

East Gippsland catchment
Rivers of Gippsland (region)
Important Bird Areas of Victoria (Australia)